The Metropolitan Autonomous University (Spanish: Universidad Autónoma Metropolitana) also known as UAM, is a Mexican public university. Founded in 1974 with the support of then-President Luis Echeverria Alvarez, the institution aims to be closely linked to the social and human environment.

As an autonomous university, UAM is a public agency of the Mexican government. It has five academic units located in Mexico City and Greater Mexico City: Azcapotzalco, in north, Iztapalapa, in east, Cuajimalpa, in west, Xochimilco, in south, and Lerma in State of Mexico.),

The institution is among the top academic universities in Mexico. In 2019, it ranked first among both public and private institution, was second in the number of full-time research professors with doctorates, according to the Comparative Study of Mexican Universities (Estudio Comparativo de Universidades Mexicanas); having the second largest number of built in National and Research System (Sistema Nacional de Investigadores) the second in having researchers at Level 3 of the same researchers. One of the leading universities in Mexico to submit the highest number of research. And the second institution to have publications in refereed journals, such as the Institute for Scientific Information, Latindex and journals included in the Index of Mexican Journals of Scientific and Technological Research of the National Council of Science and Technology (Consejo Nacional de Ciencia y Tecnología) and the second to have magazines within the Conacyt, it is also among the top four with the largest number of patents granted in Mexico.

History 
After the historic 1968 Tlatelolco massacre in Mexico concluded, and after other subsequent movements in favor of education and claim social improvements, the need for comprehensive education reform in Mexico was evident.

In 1973, during the administration of President Luis Echeverria Alvarez, the National Association of Universities and Institutions of Higher Education (ANUIES), he presented a document to the President noting the need to establish a new university in the metropolitan area Mexico City, taking into consideration issues such as increasing student demand and the increasing failure of existing universities to admit more students.

It then proposed that the nascent university project also constituted an opportunity to modernize higher education in the country. The expected characteristics of the new university were it to be public, metropolitan, independent, innovative addition to its educational and organizational terms. It is under such expectations that the law comes into force for the creation of the Autonomous Metropolitan University, on 1 January 1974. On 10 January of that year, he was appointed first Rector of the UAM architect Pedro Ramirez Vazquez.

The University is established since its creation three units, which are located in Iztapalapa, Azcapotzalco and Xochimilco, with the idea of promoting decentralization and allow the full development of each. Empirically, scientific research in Iztapalapa (UAM-I) Unit is located, the traditional careers such as civil engineering and architecture at the Azcapotzalco (UAM-A) unit and the area of health in the Xochimilco Unit (UAM -X). Subsequently, it was decided that their internal organization would be composed of divisions and academic departments, creating a contrast with the Schools and Colleges of existing universities. Each division would group different areas of knowledge and related disciplines each department, in order to give a flexible structure that prevents the lag that education has suffered in relation to the progress of science. The first Rector of the Iztapalapa Unit was Dr. Alonso Fernandez González and began operations on September 30, 1974.

In turn, the Rector of the Azcapotzalco Unit was Dr. Juan Casillas García de León, which opened its doors 11 November 1974. For the Xochimilco was Rector Dr. Ramon Villarreal Perez, initiating teaching also the November 11, 1974. Recently, the possibility of creating a new unit of the UAM was analyzed. The April 26, 2005 the Academic College of the institution approved the creation of the Cuajimalpa campus, appointing in June of that year Dr. Fresán Magdalena Orozco as the first Rector. The activities of the Unit officially pulled the September 14, 2005, using different locations, at first at the Universidad Iberoamericana. Then he took three temporary facilities: Baja California, Artifice and Constituents Constituents adding a fourth in 647. His final location was achieved in 2014 on the grounds of "Scorpio", ancient land of the Zona Especial Forestal y de Repoblación Bosques Industriales La Venta,  which had not been built by the lack of legal certainty and the opposition of local people to Ocotal forest development in the sale of Cuajimalpa.

Campuses
The university system has 5 units, with campuses located in different boroughs of Mexico City and in the adjacent state:
 UAM Azcapotzalco — located in Azcapotzalco, northern Mexico City
 UAM Iztapalapa — located in Iztapalapa, eastern Mexico City
 UAM Cuajimalpa — located in Cuajimalpa, western Mexico City
 UAM Xochimilco — located in Coyoacán, southern Mexico City.
 UAM Lerma — located near Toluca, in the State of Mexico.

Main office
UAM Rectoría is the main office of the university system. It is located in the south of the city, on Canal de Miramontes street near Xochimilco.

Gallery

See also

Notes

References

Universidad Autónoma Metropolitana
Educational institutions established in 1974
1974 establishments in Mexico